Włodzimierz Zbigniew Wachowicz (born 23 August 1946) is a Polish former handball player who competed in the 1972 Summer Olympics.

He was born in Piotrków Trybunalski.

In 1972 he was part of the Polish team which finished tenth in the Olympic tournament. He played all five matches and scored two goals.

External links
profile

1946 births
Living people
Sportspeople from Piotrków Trybunalski
Polish male handball players
Olympic handball players of Poland
Handball players at the 1972 Summer Olympics